Ottar Gravås  (2 August 1922 – 17 October 1985) was a Norwegian politician.

He was born in Leksvik to farmer Julius Gravås and Anette Bjørseth. He was elected representative to the Storting for the period 1973–1977 for the Christian Democratic Party.

References

1922 births
1985 deaths
People from Leksvik
Christian Democratic Party (Norway) politicians
Members of the Storting